The third season of Next Great Baker aired from November 26, 2012, to February 11, 2013. Like the previous season, this season was set at the Carlo's Bake Shop facility at Lackawanna Center in Jersey City, New Jersey. Unlike the previous two seasons, the finale for this season took place outside of the greater New York City area – in this case, in Las Vegas, Nevada at The Venetian Las Vegas.

The winner of this season was Ashley Holt, who won $100,000 and a spread in Redbook magazine, and will work beside Buddy Valastro in the bakery.

Contestants
Thirteen contestants competed during this season:

Contestant progress
As episode 5 ("New Year's Eve, Hoboken Style!") and episode 11 ("Road to the Finale") were not competition episodes, there are no columns for those episodes in the following table.

 (WIN) The baker(s) won the challenge.
 (WIN) The baker won individual immunity and the elimination challenge.
 (HIGH) The baker(s) had one of the best cakes for that challenge, but did not win.
 (IN) The baker(s) did not win nor lose and advanced to the next week.
 (LOW) The baker(s) was/were a part of the team who lost, but was not the last to move on.
 (LOW) This baker was singled out as one of the worst teammates, and was/were the last to move on.
 (OUT) The baker(s) was/were eliminated.
 (IN) The baker(s) had immunity.
 (WD) The baker(s) voluntarily withdrew from the competition.

Notes

Episode guide

Production notes
Contestant James Brown withdrew from the competition prior to the December 3, 2012 broadcast, after having been diagnosed with a benign brain tumor and being affected by the stress of his upcoming medical treatment. In a statement, Brown said, in part, "I have been focused on my health and am working with my doctors to prepare for surgery to remove the tumor, which will happen early next year."

Following the competition, Buddy hired contestant Paul Conti to work at Carlo's Bakery alongside Ashley, after Paul lost his job and home due to Hurricane Sandy.

Chad Durkin was also later hired by Buddy for his pastry skills, and can be seen in the 2015 season of Cake Boss.

References

General references 
 
 
 

2012 American television seasons
2013 American television seasons
Next Great Baker